Yauheni Karaliou (born 26 March 1991) is a Belarusian diver. At the 2013 European Diving Championships in Kazan he finished third in the Men's Synchronized diving, and 4th in the Men's Synchronized diving and 10m platform. After competing at the 19th FINA Diving World Cup in Shanghai, he competed at the 2014 European Aquatics Championships in Berlin in the Men's 3 m synchro springboard with Andrei Pawluk, and in the Men's 10 m synchro platform with Vadim Kaptur.

References

Belarusian male divers
Living people
1991 births
Divers at the 2016 Summer Olympics
Olympic divers of Belarus